Makapania is an extinct genus of large caprine or ovibovine from the Pliocene and Pleistocene of southern and East Africa. It is remarkable in that its horns were positioned laterally. Its body weight is estimated to have been about 263 kg.

Makapania is thought to have been both a browser and a grazer. It probably preferred grasses, and would have required a nearby source of permanent water.

Makapania broomi has been found at Sterkfontein Members 4 and 5, Swartkrans Members 1-3, Gladysvale, Motsetse and possibly Coopers. It has been recovered from 3-million-year-old sediments in East Africa. The type specimen was found at Makapansgat. This species existed from about 3 mya until 1 mya, or perhaps more recently.

Remains of an undescribed species of either Makapania or an unnamed related genus were found in mountain areas of South Africa and dated to just the 6th millennium BCE. The final extinction of this animal could be related to the retreat of dry grasslands in southern and eastern Africa after the Last Glacial Maximum, which also affected other megafauna from this environment like the giant hartebeest Megalotragus, giant zebra Equus capensis, springbok Antidorcas bondi, and bluebuck Hippotragus leucophaeus.

References

Gould, S. J. The book of life: An illustrated history of the evolution of life on Earth. 2nd edition.
Hilton-Barber, B. & Berger, L. R. (2004) Field guide to the Cradle of Humankind: Sterkfontein, Swartkrans, Kromdraai & Environs World Heritage Site. Struik Publishers, Cape Town.

Prehistoric caprids
Pleistocene even-toed ungulates
Pliocene first appearances
Pleistocene genus extinctions
Pliocene even-toed ungulates
Pliocene mammals of Africa
Pleistocene mammals of Africa
Fossil taxa described in 1957
Prehistoric even-toed ungulate genera